The irrigation works in ancient Sri Lanka, the earliest dating from about 300 BCE, in the reign of King Pandukabhaya and under continuous development for the next thousand years, were some of the most complex irrigation systems of the ancient world. In addition to constructing underground canals, the Sinhalese were among the first to build completely artificial reservoirs to store water. The system was extensively restored and further extended during the reign of King Parākramabāhu (1153–1186 CE).

According to Sri Lankan history, the first tank was built by King Pandukabhaya, who reigned from 437 to 367 BC. It is said that he had three tanks built, namely Abhaya wewa, Gamini wewa, and Jaya wewa, yet, presently, only one tank named Basawakkulama wewa, which is known as the Abhaya wewa in the past, can be identified. After King Pandukabhaya, King Parakramabahu I had many tanks built, with one large tank called Parakrama samudraya still providing water for agriculture. It can be said that many rulers of Sri Lanka contributed to the development and construction of tanks all over the Raja Rata (Northern part of the country).

See also
 Anuradhapura Kingdom: Irrigation and water management
Ancient constructions of Sri Lanka
Henry Parker
Tank cascade system

References

External links
 Sena de Silva, Reservoirs of Sri Lanka and their fisheries, FAO, 1998
FAO - Protection and revival of Ancient Irrigation Systems in Sri Lanka

Irrigation works
Agriculture in Sri Lanka
Irrigation in Sri Lanka